Catocala fulminea, the yellow bands underwing, is a moth of the family Erebidae. The species was first described by Giovanni Antonio Scopoli in his 1763 Entomologia Carniolica. It is found in central and southern Europe, east Asia and Siberia. The xarippe lineage has been proposed to be a distinct and valid species in its own right, instead of being only subspecifically distinct.

The wingspan is 44–52 mm.

The larvae feed on Prunus, Crataegus, pears, and oaks.

Subspecies
Catocala fulminea fulminea
Catocala fulminea chekiangensis (Mell, 1933)
Catocala fulminea kamuifuchi Ishizuka, 2009 (Japan: Hokkaido)

References

 , 2009: Notes on the Catocala fulminea (Scopoli, 1763) group (Lepidoptera: Noctuidae). Tinea 21 (1): 29-44.
 , 2012: A new species of Catocala Schrank, 1802 (Lepidoptera: Erebidae) from China. Zootaxa 3420: 63-68.

External links

Moths and Butterflies of Europe and North Africa
Fauna Europaea
Lepiforum e.V.

fulminea
Moths described in 1763
Moths of Europe
Moths of Asia
Taxa named by Giovanni Antonio Scopoli